Shelly Battery was a coastal battery located at Shelly Head, Manly, Sydney, New South Wales, Australia. The battery was constructed in 1942 during the Second World War and consisted of 1 x QF 12 pounder gun and a command post.

See also

Coastal defences of Australia during World War II
 Military history of Australia

References

External links

Artillery units and formations of Australia
Batteries in Australia
Military history of Australia during World War II